Secord may refer to:

People
 Al Secord (born 1958), Canadian National Hockey League player
 David Secord (1759–1844), businessman and politician in Upper Canada
 George Secord (1802–1881), Canadian politician
 James A. Secord (born 1953), American-born historian of science
 John Secord (1850–1898), Canadian politician and lawyer
 Laura Secord (1775–1868), Canadian heroine of the War of 1812
 Richard Secord (born 1932), US Air Force officer convicted for his involvement with the Iran-Contra scandal
 Richard Secord (politician) (1860–1935), Canadian politician
 Walt Secord (born 1964), Canadian-born Australian politician

Places
 Secord, Edmonton, Alberta, Canada, a neighborhood in west Edmonton
 Secord Township, Michigan, US

Other uses
 Laura Secord Chocolates, Canadian chocolatier and ice cream company